Clematis viticella, the Italian leather flower, purple clematis, or Virgin's bower, is a species of flowering plant in the buttercup family Ranunculaceae, native to Europe. This deciduous climber was the first clematis imported into English gardens, where it was already being grown in 1569 by Hugh Morgan, apothecary to Elizabeth I. By 1597, when it was already being called "Virgin's Bower", there were two varieties in English gardens, a blue (actually a purple-blue) and a red.

References

viticella
Flora of Europe
Plants described in 1753
Taxa named by Carl Linnaeus